The Tommy G. Robertson Railroad is a heritage railroad and amusement park attraction located in the Six Flags St. Louis amusement park in Eureka, Missouri. It opened with the park on June 5, 1971, when it was then known as the "Six Flags Railroad". Years later, it was renamed the "Tommy G. Robertson Railroad". Today, it is one of the oldest operating rides at Six Flags St. Louis.

Locomotives
Back when the Tommy G. Robertson Railroad was known as the "Six Flags Railroad" in 1971, it used to have two operating 4-4-0 "American" type steam locomotives, but as of 2021, it now only has one of those operating steam locomotives. Both locomotives run on nonpolluting propane as their fuel source.

Engine #5
Engine #5 was built by the Crown Metal Products in 1970 and sold in 1971 to Six Flags St. Louis in Eureka, Missouri. It was later sold in the 1980s to Busch Gardens Tampa in Tampa Bay, Florida where it still operates today on the Serengeti Express. Today, it is painted in a yellow paint scheme.

Engine #6 "Tommy G. Robertson"
Engine #6 was built by the Crown Metal Products in 1970 and sold in 1971 to Six Flags St. Louis in Eureka, Missouri where it still operates today. It was later given the name "Tommy G. Robertson" when the railroad was renamed the "Tommy G. Robertson Railroad". Today, it is painted in a red paint scheme.

References